Edwin Retamoso Palomino (born 23 February 1982) is a Peruvian former international footballer who played as a defensive midfielder.

Club career
Retamoso has played for Atlético Minero, Inti Gas Deportes and Cienciano.

International career
He made his international debut for Peru in 2011.

References

External links
 

1982 births
Living people
People from Abancay Province
Association football midfielders
Peruvian footballers
Peru international footballers
Atlético Minero footballers
Ayacucho FC footballers
Cienciano footballers
Real Garcilaso footballers
Cobreloa footballers
Chilean Primera División players
Peruvian Primera División players
Peruvian expatriate footballers
Expatriate footballers in Chile
Peruvian expatriate sportspeople in Chile
2015 Copa América players